Sarsilmaz Firearms Corp. (often referred to as 'Sars' for short) is a privately owned small arms manufacturer based in Düzce, Turkey. The company was founded in 1880 in the Ottoman Empire, and is the largest small arms manufacturer in Turkey.

Sarsilmaz is the official pistol supplier, and produces many of the small arms for the Turkish National Police and the Turkish Armed Forces, and exports firearms to 78 countries. In addition to their small arms manufacturing, Sarsilmaz entered the aviation components industry under the name TR Mekatronik in 2013, and has become one of the largest subcontractors in the sector.

Sarsilmaz firearms were formerly imported into the United States by E.A.A. In 2018 Sarsilmaz founded SAR USA to be the exclusive importer and distributor for Sarsilmaz firearms into the United States.

Products

Handguns

Semi Automatic
 B6
 B6C
 CM9
 CM9 Gen 2
 ST9
 ST9-S/SS
 SAR9
 ST10
 K11
 K10C
 P8L
 P8S
 K2-45
K2C 
 K12
 K12 Sport/X
 Kılınç 2000
 AR-24
 AR-24K

Revolvers
SR-38

Hunting Rifles and Shotguns

Semi-Automatic
 Magic
 Magic Slug
 SA-W 700 series
 SA-X 700 series
 Franchi
 M204 series 
 M206 W
 M212

Over and Under Shotguns
 SP-WSS 512 Noble
 SP-W 512 Chic
 SP-W 512 Bella
 SP-WS 512
 SP-XS 512

Trap Shooting
 SP-512 Trap
 SP-512 Double Trap
 SP-512 Skeet

Submachine Guns
 SAR 109T - adopted by Turkish Army in 2014.
SAR 109C
 TE 54

Infantry Rifles
 SAR 223P - Turkish produced AR-15/M16 clone
SAR 223T 
SAR 223C
SAR 308
SAR 56 - Designed for Police Special Operation Department

Machine Guns 

 SAR-240 PMT
 SAR-127 PMT

References

External links

Companies established in 1880
1880 establishments in the Ottoman Empire
Firearm manufacturers of Turkey